"Don't Get Me Started" is a song co-written and recorded by American country music artist Rhett Akins.  It was released in March 1996 as the lead single from Akins' Somebody New album, it is also Akins' only number one hit on the Billboard Hot Country Songs. The song also peaked at number 3 on the RPM Country Tracks in Canada. It was written by Akins, Sam Hogin, and Mark D. Sanders.

Critical reception
Deborah Evans Price, of Billboard magazine reviewed the song favorably saying that while the song had the potential to "descend into sticky sweetness", the "earnestness in Akins' vocals elevates the song and makes this a thoroughly enjoyable outing."

Chart performance
"Don't Get Me Started" debuted at number 65 on the U.S. Billboard Hot Country Songs for the week of March 30, 1996. It spent 21 weeks on the Hot Country Songs charts.

Year-end charts

References

1996 singles
1996 songs
Rhett Akins songs
Songs written by Rhett Akins
Songs written by Mark D. Sanders
Decca Records singles
Song recordings produced by Mark Wright (record producer)
Songs written by Sam Hogin